Halsey Ralph Ricardo (1854–1928) was an English architect and designer.

He established his practice in 1878, and for 10 years worked in partnership with William De Morgan (1839–1917), for whom he designed tiles, vases, and other artefacts. He advocated the use of glazed materials to resist the polluted atmosphere of nineteenth century London. In this, he anticipated the designs of Otto Wagner in Vienna, who used coloured tiles set in the same planes as walls and piers to suggest architectural features. 

He designed several buildings, of which the best were the Howrah Station, gateway to Calcutta, situated in the twin city Howrah, district Howrah, West Bengal, India (1901; with a glowing exterior of brick and coloured tiles), and Debenham House in Holland Park (1905–8), completely faced with impervious glazed materials, even the roof-tiles. He was an Arts-and-Crafts architect, whose work was extraordinarily sensitive, imaginative, and original. Among his works his own house, ‘Woodside’, Graffham, near Petworth, Sussex (1905), deserves note. In 1910, Ricardo was elected as the Master of the Art Workers' Guild.

In 1882, Halsey designed a mantelpiece for the house at Buckminster Park, then the seat for the Earls of Dysart. It was part of a larger plan for the dining room of the house. The green used was mixed by Ricardo and then copied by Wedgwood as a new jasperware color. Originally called "peach green," it is now known as "Dysart green," from the original owners of the house. 

In 1914-15, he designed a house in Chelsea, London, as a wedding gift for his daughter, Anna. 
His son, Harry Ricardo, contributed to the development of the internal combustion engine.

References 

Architects from London
1854 births
1928 deaths
English people of Portuguese-Jewish descent
Masters of the Art Worker's Guild